Tradition Book: Celestial Chorus is a tabletop role-playing game supplement originally published by White Wolf Publishing in July 1996 for their game Mage: The Ascension.

Contents
Celestial Chorus is the fifth in the Tradition Book series, and is presented as extracts from the latest edition of the fictional The Book of Ages, the central codex of the Chorus throughout its millennia of existence.

Release
The book was originally released by White Wolf Publishing in July 1996, with a second edition following in June 2001.

Reception
Adam Tinworth reviewed Celestial Chorus for Arcane magazine, rating it a 5 out of 10 overall. Tinworth comments that "For any player keen to take on the playing of such a religious character, this book provides a valuable grounding in the origin of the movement. But crucial elements that both players and storytellers alike will be looking for are sadly lacking. This is something of a missed opportunity."

Reviews
Backstab #32 (Jul-Aug 2001)

References

External links
Guide du Rôliste Galactique

Mage: The Ascension
Role-playing game books
Role-playing game supplements introduced in 1996